Wayne High School can refer to:

Wayne High School (Indiana) in Fort Wayne, Indiana
Wayne High School (Nebraska) in Wayne, Nebraska
Wayne High School (New York) in Ontario Center, New York
Wayne High School (Ohio) in Huber Heights, Ohio
Wayne High School (West Virginia) in Wayne, West Virginia
Wayne High School (Utah) in Bicknell, Utah
Wayne County High School (Georgia) in Jesup, Georgia
Wayne County High School (Kentucky) in Monticello, Kentucky
Wayne County High School (Mississippi) in Waynesboro, Mississippi
Wayne Memorial High School in Wayne, Michigan